The High Commissioner of Malaysia to the Republic of Singapore is the head of Malaysia's diplomatic mission to Singapore. The position has the rank and status of an Ambassador Extraordinary and Plenipotentiary and is based in the High Commission of Malaysia, Singapore.

List of heads of mission

High Commissioners to Singapore

See also
 Malaysia–Singapore relations

References 

 
Singapore
Malaysia